The LRAC de 73mm Mle 1950 (lance-roquettes antichar de 73 mm modèle 1950 (LRAC 73-50)) was a French antitank rocket launcher produced and fielded in the 1950s. The LRAC fired a 73-mm high explosive antitank projectile that was capable of penetrating over 11 inches (280 mm) of rolled homogenous armor when struck at a 90-degree angle of impact. The LRAC 73-50 was replaced in French service by the LRAC F1. Used during the Korean War for the French Battalion of the United Nations Organisation, it pierced the armor of T-34 tanks.

The LRAC 73-50 had a shield to protect the operator's face from the rocket's back-blast.

References

J. E. Stauff, J. Guillot, and R. Dubernet, Comité pour l'histoire de l'armement terrestre (COMHART) Tome 10 Armements Antichars Missiles Guidés et Non Guidés, Délégué Général pour l'Armement, 1996
John Bollendorf, ST-CW-07-29-74 Projectile Fragment Identification Guide Foreign, Defense Intelligence Agency, Washington: GPO, 31 December 1973 (DIA Guide)

Anti-tank rockets
Cold War weapons of France